This is a complete list of ice hockey players who were drafted in the National Hockey League Entry Draft by the Colorado Rockies franchise. It includes every player whom the team drafted in the five drafts they took part in, from 1977 to 1981, regardless of whether they played for the team.

Key
 Played at least one game with the Rockies
 Spent entire NHL career with the Rockies

Draft picks

See also
 List of Colorado Rockies (NHL) players
 List of Kansas City Scouts draft picks
 List of New Jersey Devils draft picks

Footnotes

References

 
 

 
draft picks
Colorado Rockies (NHL)